Howli Rural District is a rural district (dehestan) in the Central District of Paveh County, Kermanshah Province, Iran. At the 2006 census, its population was 6,330, in 1,627 families. The rural district has 12 villages.

References 

Rural Districts of Kermanshah Province
Paveh County